was a , built for the Imperial Japanese Navy immediately following World War I. Advanced for their time, these ships served as first-line destroyers through the 1930s, but were considered obsolescent by the start of the Pacific War.

History
Construction of the large-sized Minekaze-class destroyers was authorized as part of the Imperial Japanese Navy's 8-4 Fleet Program from fiscal 1917-1920, as an accompaniment to the medium-sized  with which they shared many common design characteristics. Equipped with powerful engines, these vessels were capable of high speeds and were intended as escorts for the projected s, which were ultimately never built. Yūkaze, built at the Mitsubishi shipyards, Nagasaki, was the tenth ship of this class. The destroyer was laid down on 14 December 1920, launched on 28 May 1921 and commissioned on 24 August 1921.

On completion, Yūkaze was assigned to Yokosuka Naval District as part of Destroyer Division 3 under the IJN 2nd Fleet. On 11 October 1928, in Uraga Channel, while on night training maneuvers, Yūkaze collided with her sister ship , resulting in significant damage and requiring extensive repairs. 
 
In 1937-1938, Yūkaze was assigned to patrols of the central China coastlines in support of Japanese efforts in the Second Sino-Japanese War

World War II history
At the time of the attack on Pearl Harbor, Yūkaze was under Carrier Division 3 in the IJN 1st Fleet based at the Kure Naval District as part of the escort for the old aircraft carrier . As such, the destroyer participated in the Battle of Midway.

Afterwards, Hōshō was used to train naval aviators, remaining in the Inland Sea under the IJN 3rd Fleet, and Yūkaze continued to serve as the aircraft carrier's escort through the end of World War II.

On 5 October 1945 Yūkaze was removed from navy list.

After the war, Yūkaze was used as a repatriation vessel from October 1945 through August 1947, when the ship was turned over to the British Royal Navy as a prize of war in Singapore, where she was broken up for scrap.

Notes

References

External links
 
 
 

Minekaze-class destroyers
Yūkaze
1921 ships
Second Sino-Japanese War naval ships of Japan
World War II destroyers of Japan
Captured ships